Gävleborg County held a county council election on 14 September 2014, on the same day as the general and municipal elections.

Results
The number of seats remained at 75 with the Social Democrats winning the most at 26, a drop of two from 2010. The party gained 34.3% of an overall valid vote of 181,001.

Municipalities

Images

References

Elections in Gävleborg County
Gävleborg